Chances may refer to:

 Chances (TV series), an Australian soap opera
 Chances (Philippine TV series), a prime-time soap opera
 Chances: The Women of Magdalene, a 2006 documentary film
 Chances (novel), a 1981 novel by Jackie Collins
 The Chances, a 1617 play by John Fletcher
 Total chances, a baseball statistic
 Chances (film), a 1931 American Pre-Code war drama

Music 
 Chances (Jill Barber album), 2008
 Chances (Sylver album)
 "Chances" (Five for Fighting song), 2009
 "Chances" (Roxette song), 1988
 "Chances", song by Athlete from Tourist, 2005, and covered by Westlife from Gravity, 2010
 "Chances" (Backstreet Boys song), 2018
 "Chances", song by Dido from the album Still on My Mind, 2019

See also
 Chances Peak, a point of the stratovolcano Soufrière Hills
 Chance (disambiguation)